Mette Mestad (born 19 November 1958) is a former Norwegian biathlete and winner of the second overall world cup for women. She won the overall Biathlon World Cup in the 1983/84 season. She became Norwegian champion seven times.

References

1958 births
Living people
Norwegian female biathletes